A prize-linked savings account or PLSA (also called a lottery-linked deposit account) is a savings account where some of the interest payment on bank deposits or marketing dollars are distributed as prizes based on chance. They are attractive to consumers as they function both as a sweepstakes or game of chance (as there is a chance of a large prize) and as savings vehicle (the deposit is never lost, unlike normal lotteries). PLSAs are similar to lottery bonds except they are offered by banks, credit unions, prepaid card companies, and financial technology companies, and can be held for a period of time determined by the consumer. Sometimes the returns are in-kind prizes rather than cash.

PLSAs have attracted customers who were previously familiar with only raffles or lotteries, but were interested in receiving guaranteed saving security as well as an attractive incentive in the form of lotteries.

United States

The PLSA program in Michigan, USA, "Save to Win", was introduced in 2009 as a full scale demonstration by Commonwealth (formerly D2D Fund Inc.), Filene Research Institute, and the Michigan Credit Union League following research by Peter Tufano from Harvard Business School, who co-founded Commonwealth in 2001. During this research, 56% of the participants were non-savers before the program.

PLSAs have been the source of some controversy as some state-run lottery boards have claimed that PLSAs infringe upon their rights, although as time progresses we are seeing more and more states working with institutions to roll out this financial vehicle.

The American Savings Promotion Act was signed into law in 2014, opening the door for all financial institutions to be included in state-level legislation. As of 2018, 33 states had passed legislation or taken legal action to ensure banks and credit unions (or in some states, only credit unions) can offer savings promotion raffles.

Prize-linked savings accounts have the potential to help combat low rates of savings among Americans.  They offer more incentive than a traditional savings account as an individual may be discoursed earning a low rate of return in a standard savings account. US families that play the lottery all tend to spend roughly the same amount regardless of economic status. Because of this, those falling in the low end of the economic distribution have the potential to see true growth of personal savings through the use of a PSLA.

Credit unions 
Examples of prize-linked savings in the credit union space include:
 Big Prize Savings (California)
 Bucks for Buckeyes (Ohio)
 Lucky Savers (New York)
 Lucky Lagniappe (Louisiana)
 Neighborhood Credit Union (Texas)
 Save to Win (Connecticut, Illinois, Indiana, Kansas, Michigan, Missouri, Nebraska, North Carolina, Oregon, South Carolina, Washington)
 Saver's Sweepstakes (Wisconsin)
 WINcentive Savings (Delaware, Massachusetts,   Minnesota)

Save to Win (from the Michigan Credit Union League) and WINcentive (operated by the Minnesota Credit Union Network) are the two largest credit union PLS products. Both operate as multi-institution models meaning multiple credit unions can offer the product and share the prize pool.

Banks 
Examples of prize-linked savings in banks include:
 FirstPrize  from First County Bank in Connecticut
 Jackpot Savings from Blue Ridge Bank in Virginia
 Lucky Piggy Savings from BankFive in Massachusetts
 Win-Win CD from Community Bank offered in Idaho, Oregon, and Washington state

Direct to consumer 
Examples of prize-linked savings in direct-to-consumer financial technology applications include PrizePool, Flourish Savings, Yotta, Long Game, WinWin, and Grand.

Prize Savings was launched in 2016 on the Walmart MoneyCard (a reloadable prepaid debit card) in partnership with Commonwealth and Green Dot Bank. Each dollar saved in a cardholder’s Vault (savings pocket) earns an entry into monthly drawings for one of 999 prizes of $25 or one $1,000 grand prize. Every Vault user is automatically entered to participate. In the first year alone, over 200,000 people have used the MoneyCard Vault and saved over $500 million. Two years after the launch of the Vault and Prize Savings, customers had moved $2 billion through the MoneyCard Vault, their savings increased by 35% on average, and there was a 274% increase in usage.

Around the world
Prize-linked savings accounts have been offered in Argentina, Brazil, Colombia, Germany, Indonesia, Iran, Japan, Mexico, Oman, Pakistan, Spain, South Africa, Sri Lanka, Turkey, United Arab Emirates and Venezuela. In South Africa, the First National Bank created a program called the Million a Month Account (MAMA), aimed at increasing savings accounts among unbanked people. It was later closed after the state-run lottery sued them for infringing upon their monopoly.

In Iran, PLSAs are the most common form of savings account available to the public, as they are viewed to be in compliance with Islamic law which forbids one to earn guaranteed interest on assets. See Islamic banking.

Economics of prize linked savings 
The success of the prize linked savings account can be attributed to several concepts studied in the field of behavioral economics. One such concept is the availability heuristic. Essentially people are likely to associate and have faith in things which readily come to mind, such as winning a lottery, as lottery winners are prevalent in media. Another behavioral economic concept which contributes to the success of prize linked savings is the sunk cost fallacy. This is displayed in prize linked savings as people who use these accounts will often save an increasing amount of money to up their odds in winning the prize, regardless of how small the odds are. The misunderstanding of small probabilities also can be attributed to the success of prize linked savings as it is nearly impossible for any individual to fathom odds in the millions as our day to day lives deal with quantities going no higher than a few thousand. The demand for prize linked savings accounts is seen to be highest amongst those with relatively low savings. This group of individuals is also more prone to gambling so Prize-Linked savings accounts have more potential to induce savings in this population. Skewness also plays into the appeal of PLSAs as it is essentially the idea that there is some chance to win a big prize with possible odds that could be realized (although they are small).

Institutional appeal of prize linked savings 

Prize linked savings account have several appeals to financial institutions which other savings and investment vehicles do not offer. PLSAs are not very complex in their investment strategy and typically go for risk-averse vehicles so they often require less effort and maintenance on behalf of the institution. They offer the consumer transparency and legitimacy as the institution can consistently offer the same prize through the adjustment of odds in relation to the amount of interest being made on the collective fund. Finally, PLSAs can maximize the liquidity of their consumers by denying those who frequently make withdrawals eligibility to win prizes.

See also

Premium Bond

References

External links 
 No-Lose Lottery from Freakonomics
 "How to Trick People Into Saving Money", The Atlantic, May 2017
 "SaveUp $2 Million Jackpot Rewards Saving, Debt-Paying", Huffington Post, May 2012

Bank account